Giovanni Salvatore (ca.1620ca.1688) was a Neapolitan composer and organist.

Salvatore was born in Castelvenere.  He is thought to have studied under Giovanni Maria Sabino and Erasmo di Bartolo at the Conservatorio della Pietà dei Turchini, Naples in Naples. He was first organist for the church of Santi Severino e Sossio, then maestro di cappella at San Lorenzo Maggiore (Naples). From 1662 to 1673 he taught at the Conservatorio della Pietà dei Turchini, then moved to be maestro di cappella of the Conservatorio dei Poveri di Gesù Cristo.  He died in Naples.

Works
 Requiem - Missa defunctorum
 Mass and vespers
 Messa della Domenica
 Magnificat 5 voices and two violins
Polychoral motets:
 Audite coeli for 4 choirs
 Song of the three boys - Canticum trium puerorum, for 4 choirs 1657
 Confitebor for 2 choirs
 Credidi for 4 choirs
 Keyboard works
 Canzoni for Four Viols
 Secular arias

Recordings
 Salvatore: Messa della Domenica. Ricercari a quattro voci. Toccate. Canzoni francesi. Fabio Bonizzoni. Schola Stirps Jesse Glossa 921501
 Magnificat a 5 voci con violini. Cappella della Pietà de' Turchini dir. Florio Symphonia.

External Links

References

Italian Baroque composers
1620s births
1688 deaths
People from the Province of Benevento
Italian male classical composers
17th-century Italian composers
17th-century male musicians